The 1974 Izu Peninsula earthquake occurred on May 9 at . The epicenter was located off the Izu Peninsula, Japan. Twenty-five people were reported dead. Landslides and damage of roads, buildings, and infrastructure were reported. This earthquake triggered a small tsunami. The intensity in Tokyo reached shindo 3. The magnitude of this earthquake was put at  6.5, or  6.9.

See also
List of earthquakes in 1974
List of earthquakes in Japan

References

External links

Izu Peninsula Earthquake, 1974
1974 in Japan
1974 tsunamis
May 1974 events in Asia
Earthquakes of the Showa period